Mirninsky District (Miiriney uluuha) is an administrative and municipal district (raion, or ulus), one of the thirty-four in the Sakha Republic, Russia. It is located in the west of the republic and borders Olenyoksky District in the north and northeast, Nyurbinsky and Suntarsky Districts in the east, Lensky District in the south, and Irkutsk Oblast and Krasnoyarsk Krai in the west. Its administrative center is the town of Mirny. As of the 2010 Census, the total population of the district (excluding its administrative center) was 38,802.

Geography
The Vilyuy and its tributary Ulakhan-Botuobuya are the main rivers in the district.

Climate

History
The Vilyuy River basin was believed to contain mineral deposits at least as early as the 19th century, with Richard Maack reporting after an expedition to the area that the area was rich in iron, salt deposits, and precious stones. He described a nest of blue clay in the area between the Vilyuy and Malaya Bituobiya Rivers, but as kimberlites had not yet been discovered there was no official attention.

Around the beginning on the 20th century, a number of scientists and geologists noted similarities between parts of the Central Siberian Plateau and areas in South Africa, where exploitation of primary diamond deposits had already begun. In 1937, the Soviet government began to greatly increase effort to produce diamonds on its own territory, due in part to some other diamond-producing nations being unwilling to sell to the USSR. Expeditions were organized in the basins of the Yenisei River and in the Ural Mountains. The Ural expedition proved the more successful, finding small, but commercially viable deposits.

An additional government decree signed by Stalin in 1946 announced further exploration for diamonds, with expeditions mounted from Irkutsk into the region of the Yenisei River. The first officially recorded discovery of diamonds in Yakutia (the present-day Sakha Republic) was made in 1949 on an expedition along the Vilyuy. Initially, discoveries centered on placer deposits, which did not uncover the enormous primary deposits in the form of kimberlite pipes.

The first kimberlite deposit, Zarnitsa mine, was discovered on August 21, 1954. Further exploration in 1955 found over fifteen primary deposits, including the largest pipes at Udachny and Mirny. Over two hundred kimberlite pipes have since been identified in the Sakha Republic.

Mirninsky District was established on January 12, 1965, after large-scale diamond mining was started in the area and associated industries began to grow.

Administrative and municipal status
Within the framework of administrative divisions, Mirninsky District is one of the thirty-four in the republic. It is divided into two towns (administrative divisions with the administrative centers in the towns (inhabited localities) of Mirny and Udachny), four settlements (administrative divisions with the administrative centers in the urban-type settlements (inhabited localities) of Aykhal, Almazny, Chernyshevsky, and Svetly), and three rural okrugs (naslegs), all of which comprise eight rural localities. As a municipal division, the district is incorporated as Mirninsky Municipal District. Within the municipal district, the two towns and the four settlements are incorporated into six urban settlements, and the three rural okrugs are incorporated into three rural settlements. The town of Mirny serves as the administrative center of both the administrative and municipal district.

Inhabited localities

Economy
The economy of the district is mostly based on mining. Natural resources include diamonds, oil, gas, and brown coal. Diamond mining is mostly carried out by ALROSA company and its subsidiaries.

Transportation
Mirninsky District is connected with Yakutsk by the means of the Vilyuy Highway.

Demographics 

As of the 1989 Census, the ethnic composition was as follows:
Russians: 67.5%
Ukrainians: 9.8%
Yakuts: 7.6%
Tatars: 6.5%
Buryats: 1.3%

See also 
 Lena Plateau

References

Notes

Sources
Official website of the Sakha Republic. Registry of the Administrative-Territorial Divisions of the Sakha Republic. Mirninsky District. 

Districts of the Sakha Republic
States and territories established in 1965